The Hochmättli is a mountain of the Glarus Alps, located on the border between the Swiss cantons of Glarus and St. Gallen. It lies in the Murgtal, near the Murgsee, south of the Walensee.

References

External links
 Hochmättli on Hikr

Mountains of the Alps
Mountains of Switzerland
Mountains of the canton of St. Gallen
Mountains of the canton of Glarus
Glarus–St. Gallen border